Frank Bleckmann (born 3 August 1967) is a German former fencer. He competed in the individual and team sabre events at the 1996 Summer Olympics.

References

External links
 

1967 births
Living people
German male fencers
Olympic fencers of Germany
Fencers at the 1996 Summer Olympics
Sportspeople from Mülheim